Desulo, Dèsulu in sardinian language, is a comune (municipality) in the Province of Nuoro in the Italian region Sardinia, located about  north of Cagliari and about  south of Nuoro.  

Desulo borders the following municipalities: Aritzo, Arzana, Belvì, Fonni, Ovodda, Tiana, Tonara, Villagrande Strisaili.

References

External links

 Official website

Cities and towns in Sardinia